Nguyễn Hiếu Trung Anh (born 12 June 1992) is a Vietnamese footballer who plays as a defender or midfielder for V.League 2 club Cần Thơ.

References

1992 births
Living people
Vietnamese footballers
V.League 1 players
Can Tho FC players
People from Cần Thơ
Association football defenders
Association football midfielders